Bayud  is a Syrian village located in Al-Hamraa Nahiyah in Hama District, Hama.  According to the Syria Central Bureau of Statistics (CBS), Bayud had a population of 737 in the 2004 census. During Syria civil war, Bayud was captured by ISIS, then SAA liberated this town from ISIS on 5 February 2018.

References 

Populated places in Hama District